The men's 4 × 100 metres relay event at the 2002 Asian Athletics Championships was held in Colombo, Sri Lanka on 9–10 August.

Results

Heats

Final

References

2002 Asian Athletics Championships
Relays at the Asian Athletics Championships